Edward May may refer to:

Sir Edward May, 2nd Baronet (?1751–1814), MP for Belfast
Teddy May (Edward May, 1865–1941), English footballer
Eddie May (Scottish footballer) (Edward May, born 1967), Scottish football player and manager
Edward Ralph May (1819–1852), only delegate to 1850 Indiana Constitutional Convention to vote for African-American suffrage
Edward Harrison May (1824–1887), English-American painter
Edward May (poet), poet whose work is included in The Oxford Book of Short Poems (1985)
E. J. May (1853–1941), English architect
Edward Collett May (1806-1887), English music educator

See also
Eddie May (Edwin May, 1943–2012), English footballer